Elections in Karnataka, a state in India are conducted in accordance with the Constitution of India. The Assembly of Karnataka creates laws regarding the conduct of local body elections unilaterally while any changes by the state legislature to the conduct of state level elections need to be approved by the Parliament of India. In addition, the state legislature may be dismissed by the Parliament according to Article 356 of the Indian Constitution and President's rule may be imposed.

Main Political Parties in Karnataka
BJP, INC and JD(S) are the dominant parties in the state. The CPI, CPI(M) and MES are the other active political entities in the state. In the past, the various precursors of the JD(S) such as JP and JD have also been very influential. Splinter groups such as KCP, KJP, BSR Congress, Lok Shakti and JD(U) have made their mark in a few elections. Erstwhile parties which have been influential in the state include Indian National Congress (Organisation) (NCO), Bharatiya Jana Sangh, Kisan Mazdoor Praja Party (KMPP), National Development Party, Praja Socialist Party (PSP), Samyukta Socialist Party (SSP) and Swatantra Party.

Lok Sabha elections
The 1951-1971 election are results from Mysore State.

Rajya Sabha elections
It is worth noting that the 1951-1971 election are results from Mysore State.

 Rajya Sabha Election, 2020.
 Four Candidates Elected Unopposed.
 Ashok Gasti, BJP
 Eranna Kadadi, BJP
 Mallikarjun Kharge, Congress
 H D Deve Gowda, Janata Dal - Secular

Vidhan Sabha elections

Vidhan Parishad elections

Local self-government

Rurals

Gram panchayat

Taluk panchayat

Zilla Parishad

Urban

City municipal council

Town municipal council
Mudalgi

Town panchayat

References 

 
History of Karnataka (1947–present)